Walter Gempp (13 September 1878 – 2 May 1939) was a German engineer and from 1922 to 1933 the sixth head of the Berlin Fire Brigade.

After studying mechanical engineering, Gempp joined the Berlin Fire Department in 1908.  He was given the project of developing a motorized fire extinguishing service, and in 1908 he produced the first engine-powered hose truck.  In 1923 he became chief fire commissioner in Berlin.

Gempp was head of the Berlin fire department at the time of the Reichstag fire on 27 February 1933, personally directing the operations at the incident. On 25 March he was dismissed for presenting evidence that suggested Nazi involvement in the fire. Gempp asserted that there had been a delay in notifying the fire brigade and that he had been forbidden from making full use of the resources at his disposal.

In 1937, he was arrested for abuse of office. Despite his appeal, he was imprisoned. He was later strangled and killed in prison.

References

External links
Gempp biography at Berlin Fire Department site (in German)

German people who died in prison custody
1878 births
1939 deaths
Prisoners who died in German detention
Prisoners murdered in custody
German murder victims
People murdered in Nazi Germany
Firefighters
People from Coburg (district)